Billiards competitions has been held in the Universiade only at 2017 Summer Universiade as optional sport.

Events

Medal table

External links
 2017 Summer Universiade – Billiards

Sports at the Summer Universiade